DaNae Elizabeth Couch, (born August 6, 1988) is an American beauty pageant titleholder from Coppell, Texas who was named Miss Texas 2012.

Biography
She won the title of Miss Texas on July 7, 2012, when she received her crown from outgoing titleholder Kendall Morris. Couch’s platform is “Hope for Family Recovery: Life Beyond Addiction” and she said she hoped to address drug education, addiction awareness, and recovery resources in schools. Her competition talent was a twirling routine to “You Can't Stop the Beat.” Couch graduated with a degree in English and a minor in Public Relations from Baylor University, where she was also a member of Kappa Alpha Theta. While attending Baylor, Couch was a baton twirler in the Baylor University Golden Wave Band. She is currently in her third year of attending law school at Texas Tech University and is planning to become an attorney specializing in litigation. Couch has also previously served as a summer intern for the Supreme Court of Texas.

References

External links

 

Miss America 2013 delegates
1988 births
Living people
People from Coppell, Texas
Baylor University alumni
Texas Tech University School of Law alumni
American beauty pageant winners